Viera Perederiy (born ) was a Ukrainian group rhythmic gymnast. She represented her nation at international competitions.

She participated at the 2008 Summer Olympics in Beijing. 
She also competed at world championships, including at the 2007 World Rhythmic Gymnastics Championships, and 2009 World Rhythmic Gymnastics Championships.

References

External links

http://www.the-sports.org/viera-perederiy-various-indiv-spf102298.html
http://www.sportcentric.com/vsite/vfile/page/fileurl/0,11040,5199-192501-209724-142281-0-file,00.pdf
http://chimgym.blogspot.com.br/2008/06/gymnasts-at-beijing-olympics.html
http://www.ueg.org/files/page/editor/files/Results_WCh_RG-2009.pdf

1990 births
Living people
Ukrainian rhythmic gymnasts
Place of birth missing (living people)
Gymnasts at the 2008 Summer Olympics
Olympic gymnasts of Ukraine
21st-century Ukrainian women